Crasis (from the Greek , "mixing", "blending")  is a type of contraction in which two vowels or diphthongs merge into one new vowel or diphthong, making one word out of two (univerbation). Crasis occurs in many languages, including Spanish,  Portuguese, and French; it was first described in Ancient Greek.

In some cases, as in the French examples, crasis involves the grammaticalization of two individual lexical items into one. However, in other cases, like in the Greek examples, crasis is the orthographic representation of the encliticization and the vowel reduction of one grammatical form with another. The difference between them is that the Greek examples involve two grammatical words and a single phonological word, but the French examples involve a single phonological word and grammatical word.

Greek
In both Ancient and Modern Greek, crasis merges a small word and long word that are closely connected in meaning.

In Ancient Greek, a coronis ( korōnís "curved"; plural  korōnídes) marks the vowel from crasis. In ancient times, it was an apostrophe placed after the vowel, but it is now written over the vowel and is identical to smooth breathing in Unicode. (For instance,  uses the character ; psili means smooth breathing.) Unlike a coronis, smooth breathing never occurs on a vowel in the middle of a word although it occurs in a doubled rho:  pyrrhos.

The article undergoes crasis with nouns and adjectives that start with a vowel:
  "my (affairs)"
  "on the contrary"
  "the same"
  (plural of the previous example)

καί undergoes crasis with the first-person singular pronoun and produces a long vowel:
  "and I", "I too"
  "and to me"

In the modern monotonic orthography, the coronis is not written.

French
In French, the contractions of determiners are often the results of a vocalisation and a crasis:
 de le → du, de les → des
 à le → au, à les → aux
 en les → ès (archaic)

Portuguese

The most frequently-observed crasis is now the contraction of the preposition a ("to" or "at") with the feminine singular definite article a ("the"), indicated in writing with a grave accent or the masculine singular definite article o (also "the"). For example, instead of *Vou a a praia ("I go to the beach"), one says Vou à praia ("I go to-the beach"). The contraction turns the clitic a into the stressed word à. Meanwhile, a person going to a bank, a supermarket or a marketplace would say respectively Vou ao banco, Vou ao supermercado or Vou à feira.

Crasis also occurs between the preposition a and demonstrative such as when the preposition precedes aquele(s), aquela(s) (meaning "that", "those", in different genders), which contract to àquele(s), àquela(s). The accent marks a secondary stress in Portuguese.

Crasis is very important since it can change the meaning of a sentence:

 Exposta, a polícia - The police is exposed
 Exposta à polícia - She is exposed to the police
 Glória, a rainha - Glória the queen
 Glória à rainha - Glory to the queen
 Dê a mulher - Give the woman
 Dê à mulher - Give to the woman

These rules determine whether crasis always applies or whether one may use the contraction à (with an accent) instead of the preposition a (without an accent):

Replace the preposition a by another preposition, as em ("in") or para ("to"). If after replacement, the definite article a ("the") is still possible, crasis applies:

 Pedro viajou à Região Nordeste: with a grave accent because it equivalent to "Pedro traveled 'to the' Northeast Region". Here, para a Região Nordeste could also be used.
 O autor dedicou o livro a sua esposa: without a grave accent in Brazilian Portuguese because it is equivalent to "The author dedicated the book 'to' his wife". A consistent use, according to the rules in Brazil would not allow para a sua esposa to be used instead. In European Portuguese, the rules are different, and it is O autor dedicou o livro à sua esposa, but in English, both sentences have the same meaning.

If the nominal complement is changed after "a" from a feminine noun to a masculine noun, and it is now necessary to use 'ao' as used naturally by native speakers, crasis applies:

 Prestou relevantes serviços à comunidade, He/she paid outstanding services to the community: with a grave accent because if the object is changed to a masculine noun ("Prestou relevantes serviços ao povo" He/she paid outstanding services to the people), "ao" ("to [masculine] the") is now used.
 "Chegarei daqui a uma hora" I will arrive in an hour: without crasis because when the feminine noun is changed to a masculine noun ("Chegarei daqui a um minuto" I will arrive in a minute), there is no "ao" (as "um/uma", indefinite articles, appear instead of "o/a").

The grave accent is never used before masculine words (nouns, pronouns, etc.); verbs; personal pronouns; numerals, plural nouns without the use of the feminine plural definite article as ("the"); city names that do not use a feminine article; the word casa ("house") if it has the meaning of one's own home; the word terra ("earth") when it has the meaning of soil; and indefinite, personal, relative or demonstrative pronouns (except the third person and aquele(s) or aquela(s)); between identical nouns such as dia a dia "day by day", "everyday", "daily life", gota a gota "dropwise", "drip", and cara a cara "face to face"; and after prepositions. Here are exceptions:

É preciso declarar guerra à guerra! (It is necessary to declare war on war!)

É preciso dar mais vida à vida. (It is necessary to give more life to life.)

Crasis also occurs between the preposition de and the definite articles.

 de o → do
 de a → da
 de os → dos
 de as → das

Optional crasis
The grave accent is optional in the following cases:

 Before a female's first name

Refiro-me [à/a] Fernanda. (I am referring to Fernanda.)

 Before a feminine possessive pronoun

Dirija-se [à/a] sua fazenda. (Go to your [own] farm.)

 After the preposition até

Dirija-se até [à/a] porta. (Go by that door.)

Eu fui até [à/a] França de carro. (I traveled to France by car.)

Spanish
In Spanish, crasis occurs between the prepositions a or de and the masculine definite article el.
 a el → al
 de el → del

See also
 Assimilation (linguistics)
 Clitic
 Contraction (grammar)
 Elision
 Liaison (French)
 Sandhi

Notes and references

Notes

References

External links
 Greek Grammar

Phonology
Greek language
Portuguese language

es:Crasis